Azteca christopherseni is a species of ant in the genus Azteca. Described by Forel in 1912, the species is endemic to Panama.

References

Azteca (genus)
Hymenoptera of North America
Insects described in 1912